Krokolithes is an oogenus of Crocodiloid eggs. These eggs were laid by an extinct species of Crocodylian. It contains three oospecies: K. dinophilus, K. wilsoni and K. helleri.
1
Fossils of the oogenus have been found in the Oligocene of France, the Oldman and Dinosaur Park Formations of Alberta, Canada, the Campanian Two Medicine Formation of Montana, the Barremian Cabezo Gordo Member of the Blesa Formation of Spain, and the Kimmeridgian of the Lourinhã Formation of Portugal.

References 

Egg fossils
Tithonian life
Barremian life
Campanian life
Maastrichtian life
Oligocene life
Fossils of France
Fossils of Portugal
Fossils of Spain
Paleontology in Alberta
Paleontology in Montana
Fossil parataxa described in 1985